José Tomás Jocelyn-Holt Letelier (born 16 January 1963) is a Chilean politician, former member of the Christian Democrat Party of Chile (until 2012), and former member of the Chamber of Deputies of Chile between 1994 and 2002. Jocelyn-Holt Letelier was an independent candidate for the 2013 presidential election, but lost the election with the lowest voting percentage in the history of his country.

He's the younger brother of Alfredo Jocelyn-Holt, a well known historian. He also has another brother, Enrique, an economist.

References

External links
 Official campaign website 

1963 births
Living people
Christian Democratic Party (Chile) politicians
Candidates for President of Chile
Members of the Chamber of Deputies of Chile
Pontifical Catholic University of Chile alumni
People from Santiago
Independent politicians in Chile
Presidents of the Pontifical Catholic University of Chile Student Federation
Westland Middle School alumni
20th-century Chilean lawyers